Paratriaenops is a genus in the bat family Hipposideridae. It is classified in the tribe Triaenopini, along with the closely related genus Triaenops and perhaps the poorly known Cloeotis. The species of Paratriaenops were placed in Triaenops until 2009. Paratriaenops currently contains the following species:
Paratriaenops auritus
Paratriaenops furculus
Paratriaenops pauliani
P auritus and  P. furculus are found on Madagascar, P. pauliani in the Seychelles. The species Triaenops goodmani was described from subfossil material on Madagascar in 2007, before Paratriaenops was erected, but was not considered in the revision that split the genus.

See also
List of bats of Madagascar

References

Literature cited

 
Bat genera